Cristian Raimondi (born 30 April 1981) is an Italian former footballer who played as a midfielder.

Personal life 
On 30 October 2020 he tested positive for COVID-19.

References

External links
 
 

1981 births
Living people
Sportspeople from the Province of Bergamo
Association football midfielders
Italian footballers
S.S. Arezzo players
U.C. AlbinoLeffe players
Atalanta B.C. players
Palermo F.C. players
F.C. Pro Vercelli 1892 players
L.R. Vicenza players
U.S. Livorno 1915 players
Serie A players
Footballers from Lombardy